The Council of Europe granted observer status to the Holy See on 7 March 1970, having maintained a lesser relationship since 1962, when the Apostolic Nuncio to Belgium was given the additional title Apostolic Delegate to the Council for Cultural Cooperation of the Council of Europe.

In 1970, the Holy See established a diplomatic relationship with the European Economic Community and on 10 November appointed Archbishop Eugenio Cardinale as Nuncio to the Common Market. He was given a second charge and title as "special envoy and permanent representative to the Council of Europe, the European consultative assembly in Strasbourg". The nature and status of that position has evolved as the Vatican explored how best to manage its relationship with such international bodies and how to integrate such positions into its traditional hierarchy of representatives, delegates, and nuncios. Until 2019, Cardinale's successors representing the Holy See to the Council were not bishops, nor did they have the title nuncio or other responsibilities. Bressan in 1983 was named "Special Envoy" to the Council, and his successors were named "Special Envoy with the role of Permanent Observer" until the simpler formula was adopted in 2004: "Special Envoy, Permanent Representative".

Full membership in the Council is likely precluded by the Holy See's lack of democracy and human rights guarantees. In 2007, the Holy See described its role vis-à-vis international organizations:

It successfully argued that the Council’s review of observer states recognize its "special mission" and remove language that said "Its lack of democratic institutions and its position on certain human rights matters makes [sic] it a special case".

Permanent Observers 
 Eugenio Cardinale (10 November 1970 – 24 March 1983)
 Luigi Bressan (12 February 1983 – 3 April 1989)
 Carlo Maria Viganò (14 April 1989 – 3 April 1992)
 Celestino Migliore (14 April 1992 – 21 December 1995)
 Michael Courtney (30 December 1995 – 18 August 2000)
 Paul Gallagher (18 August 2000 – 22 January 2004) 
 Vito Rallo (27 January 2004 – 12 June 2007) 
Aldo Giordano (7 June 2008 – 26 October 2013)
 Paolo Rudelli (20 September 2014. – 21 September 2019)
 Marco Ganci (21 September 2019 – present)

See also
 Apostolic Nunciature to the European Union

Notes

References

1970 establishments in France
Council of Europe